Toshima (豊島区) is a ward in Tokyo, Japan.

Toshima may also refer to:

 To-shima, Tokyo (利島), a village in Ōshima Subprefecture, Tokyo Metropolis, Japan
 Toshima, Kagoshima (十島村), a village in Kagoshima Prefecture, Japan
 Toshima clan, a Japanese samurai clan
 Toshima Station, a railway station in Tahara, Aichi Prefecture, Japan
 Tōshima Station, a railway station in Nanbu, Yamanashi Prefecture, Japan

See also
 
 Toshimasa, a Japanese given name